= Daugherty, Virginia =

Unincorporated community in Virginia, United States

Coordinates: 37°41′22″N 75°39′58″W

Daugherty is an unincorporated community in Accomack County, Virginia, United States.
